I, Human is the second full-length album by Singaporean death metal band, Deus Ex Machina, and the first to feature a permanent vocalist, giving it more uniformity in contrast to The War Inside, which had a different singer for each track. Musically, it is an edgy mixture of thrash metal, melodic death metal and progressive metal interjections, coupled with a diversified vocal approach. The lyrical content of the album deals with the future: Cloning. Specifically, questions regarding its use, legality, implications and the possibility of a world full of clones fighting to gain their own identity. The concept is based on Isaac Asimov's novel I,Robot, but also is influenced by other science fiction works such as Blade Runner, The 6th Day, A.I. Artificial Intelligence, and Warhammer 40,000. Each songs discusses the ethical issues pertaining to cloning, shifting from first person to second person to third person perspective. The band further divulges the mind frame of an unnamed clone character as it gradually realizes it is a clone, upon awaking from what it thought was a dream. In its desire to strive for acceptance as an equal, the band delves into its thoughts, fears and plans and invokes these emotions and transforms them into an aural assault with thought-provoking lyrics.

Track listing
	M(n)emo(nic)ries – 1:58
	The Mask – 3:42
	Replicant – 5:47
	Jigsaw – 4:52
	The Human Strain – 2:45
	I – 5:19
	The Omega Directive – 3:53
	Assent / Dissent – 5:30
	Hidden Track – 3:08

Personnel
Ryan Prashant Joseph – guitar
Shailendra Singh – drums
Mithun MK – lead vocals
Caspar Francis – bass

References

External links
Official website
Review
Review
Review
Interview

2009 albums
Deus Ex Machina (heavy metal band) albums
Cyberpunk music
Non-fiction Cyberpunk media